Michel Amiel (born 1954) is a French politician who has been serving as a member of the French Senate since 2014. From 2017 until 2020, he was a member of La République En Marche! (LREM).

Early life
Amiel was born on 3 July 1954.

Career
Amiel has served as a member of the French Senate since 2014. He is also the Mayor of Les Pennes-Mirabeau.

Ahead of the Republicans' 2016 primaries, Amiel endorsed Nathalie Kosciusko-Morizet as the party's candidate for the 2017 French presidential election.

In March 2020, Amiel left LREM after Prime Minister Édouard Philippe announced he would push through a controversial pensions bill by executive decree.

References

1954 births
Living people
French Senators of the Fifth Republic
Mayors of places in Provence-Alpes-Côte d'Azur
La République En Marche! politicians
Senators of Bouches-du-Rhône
People from Cannes